Julius Arnold Koch (August 15, 1864 – February 2, 1956) was an American chemist who was born in Germany. Koch graduated from the University of Pittsburgh in 1884. He was the first dean of the School of Pharmacy at the University of Pittsburgh and held this position until his retirement in 1932. In 1897, he discovered, together with Ludwig Gattermann, the Gattermann-Koch reaction (a method of synthesis of benzaldehyde using CO). He agreed on receiving the status of dean only after his following concern was taken into consideration "I will accept the deanship if the sessions are changed from evening to the daytime."

References

External links

1864 births
19th-century American chemists
20th-century American chemists
1956 deaths
Scientists from Bremen
German emigrants to the United States